The Literature Express is a novel written by Lasha Bugadze in 2009. It was translated by Maya Kiasashvili in 2014. Novel published in Saudi Arabia in 2015 (إكسبريس الأدب - by الكتب خان للنشر والتوزيع).

About a novel
"The Literature Express is at its best when embracing the literary cacophony of its setting. The characters and their furious battle to out-do one another professionally gives the book its bleak humor, and a degree of uneasy edge (...) Maya Kisashvili's translation is utterly elegant and succeeds in conveying outlandish guffaw-worthy humor without ever sounding mannered."–Tweed's Magazine

References

External links
Novel  - Goodreads.com
صدر حديثا عن دار الكتب خان للنشر رواية “إكسبريس الأدب” ، تأليف لاشا بوجادزه ، ترجمة هرمس .
novel in dalkeyarchive.com 
الكتب خان تصدر رواية "إكسبريس الأدب" لـ"لاشابوجادزه"
Google books - The Literature Express

2009 novels
21st-century Georgian novels
Georgian-language works
Satirical novels
Dalkey Archive Press books